Emerald is the ninth studio album by singer/songwriter Dar Williams, released in 2015 by Bread & Butter Music.

Release and reception
Williams found herself without a record label and turned to Kickstarter to fund this recording. For AllMusic Guide, Marcy Donelson gave the album a positive review, praising the line-up of guest musicians and Williams' cover of "Johnny Appleseed" in particular. In the Colorado Springs Independent, Loring Wirbel criticizes her "noticeable formula" for songwriting but concludes that the album is, "her most cohesive set since 2003's The Beauty of the Rain".

Track listing
All songs written by Dar Williams, except where noted.
"Something to Get Through" – 3:31
"FM Radio" (Williams, Jill Sobule) – 4:03
"Empty Plane" – 4:15
"Emerald" – 3:18
"Slippery Slope" (Williams, Jim Lauderdale) – 3:02
"Here Tonight" (Williams, Angel Snow) – 3:54
"Girl of the World" – 4:14
"Mad River" – 4:40
"Weight of the World" (Kat Goldman) – 3:18
"Johnny Appleseed" (Joe Strummer, Martin Slattery, Scott Shields, Tymon Dogg, Pablo Cook) – 3:54
"New York is a Harbor" (Williams, Bryn Roberts) – 5:15

Personnel
Dar Williams – vocals, guitar
Jim Lauderdale
Milk Carton Kids
Lucy Wainwright Roche
Angel Snow
Jill Sobule
Richard Thompson
Brad Wood – production

References

External links

2015 albums
Dar Williams albums
Albums produced by Stewart Lerman
Albums produced by Brad Wood